The Affiliated Senior High School of National Taiwan Normal University (HSNU; Traditional Chinese: 國立臺灣師範大學附屬高級中學, 附中, 師大附中) is a Taiwanese senior high school (or "high school," as opposed to "middle school" in certain usages). It is ranked top 2 among all the senior high schools in Taiwan, usually with a requirement of PR98 and above on the National Senior High School Entrance Exams. The campus is located in Da-an District in Taipei, Taiwan.

History
HSNU was founded in Taiwan as "Taipei Third State High School" in 1937 under Japanese rule. Until the end of World War II, ninety percent of the student body was Japanese.

On December 5, 1945, the government of the Republic of China changed the school's name to "Taiwan Third Provincial High School" and then again on January 1, 1946, to "Taiwan Provincial Taipei He-ping High School." Under the name "He-ping High School," the school's purpose was to educate Japanese children who did not return to Japan; at the time, most of the teachers were Japanese.

In 1947, China's political situation changed again. Government administrators' families who had lived in mainland China came to Taiwan, and the government let their children to study at He-ping High School. At that time, Taiwan Provincial Teachers' College (now National Taiwan Normal University) was preparing to establish an experimental high school as a teachers' training ground, so the college applied for the establishment of a new school. On August 1, 1947, He-ping High School became "The Affiliated Senior High School of Taiwan Provincial Teachers' College." There was also a junior high school section. In October 1949, the school took in 310 students from the National Revolutionary Army's Children's School, the largest number taken by a school in that area.

In 1955, the name of the governing teachers' college was changed to "Normal University." In 1961, the junior high school section closed, and in 1967, the teachers' college changed names once again, from "Provincial" to "National;" thus, the high school's name became "The Affiliated High School of National Taiwan Normal University." However, it was not until an associate professor of the NTNU's Education Department, Huang Zhen-Qiu, became HSNU's principal, were the high school and the university closely tied.

The film Blue Gate Crossing portrays school life in HSNU.

School features

Graduation ceremony
The annual graduation ceremony is an event organized and decorated solely by students that have been admitted into university. The team of students adorn the settings of ceremony to a theme, arrange the entertainment programs and shoot their own music videos. This event is reported by the mass media every year.

Uniform
Under Japanese rule, boys' high school uniforms in Taiwan were similar to military uniforms, khaki from top to bottom. In 1983, HSNU changed the uniform to a light blue button-down shirt with dark blue trousers. The girls' uniform was designed when girls started to enroll in the school's music program. The girls' uniform consisted of a white button-down shirt and a light blue suit skirt (with double folds down the front). The girls' uniform comes with an optional blazer jacket that matches the skirt. Most choose to wear the more comfortable black tracksuit jacket.

Experimental classes
In addition to normal classes, there have been experimental classes in HSNU. For example, between 1950 and 1961, HSNU tried a system with a four-year junior high school with two years of senior high school. The experimental science class was established in 1978 (Class 420 and Class 430 were created in the first year). In the year 2004, the Honors English Class (also known as, "English Experimental Class") was established. The first class was Senior High Class 1111. 
HSNU also take students from diplomatic families and foreign expats.

School anthem
HSNU's school anthem was composed during principal Huang's era by Shi Wei-Liang (史惟亮, Music Teacher). The text, in Chinese, was written by Guo Tang (郭橖, History Teacher) and Hsiao Hwi-Kai (蕭輝楷, Compilation Leader).

Chinese Version:
附中附中我們的搖籃，漫天烽火創建在台灣。
玉山給我們靈秀雄奇，東海使我們擴大開展。
我們來自四方，融會了各地的優點。
我們親愛精誠，師生結成了一片。
砥礪學行，鍛鍊體魄，我們是新中國的中堅。
看我們附中培育的英才，肩負起時代的重擔。
附中青年，絕不怕艱難。
復興中華，相期在明天。
把附中精神，照耀祖國的錦繡河山。
Translation:
HSNU, HSNU, our cradle,
Established in Taiwan in boundless beacon war fire.
Mount Jade gives us cleverness and grandeur,
The East China Sea makes us broad-minded.
We come from far and near and integrate all our merits together.
We are loving, earnest and sincere so that teachers and students live together harmoniously.
We encourage each other to form moral character and strong bodies,
We are the backbone of the new age of China.
Elite nurtured by HSNU can take up the heavy responsibility of a new generation,
We are never afraid of difficulties.
Let's cooperate to make efforts for the rebirth of China,
Let's enlighten the land of enchanting beauty, our fatherland, with the spirit of HSNU.

Notable alumni
 Liu Kuo-song – Senior High Class 16, painter.
 Lien Chan – Senior High Class 24, Vice President of the Republic of China, Chairman of Kuomintang.
 Koh Se-kai – Senior High Class 24, Taiwan independence movement, as of 2007 Ambassador of Republic of China in Japan.
 Chen Li-an – Senior High Class 30, President of the Control Yuan of the Republic of China.
 Gu Long – Junior High Class 36, (real name Xiong Yaohua) Taiwanese writer of wuxia novels.
 Mao Gao-wen – Senior High Class 37, Minister of the Republic of China Ministry of Education and Vice President of the Examination Yuan in Republic of China (Taiwan).
 Liu Chao-han – Experimental Class 1, President of National Central University.
 Zhang Wen-ying – Experimental Class 1, Mayor of Chiayi City, and as of 2007 serving as National Policy Consultant to the President of the Republic of China.
 Ruan Da-nien – Senior High Class 41, President of the National Chiao Tung University, the Chung Yuan Christian University, and the Tunghai University.
 Wang Wen-xin – Senior High Class 41, writer, was a professor of the National Taiwan University's Foreign Language Department.
 R. C. T. Lee – Senior High Class 41, professor, President of the National Chi Nan University and Providence University.
 Wu Cheng-wen – Experimental Class 4, President of National Health Research Institutes, as of 2007 an academic at Academia Sinica.
 Wu Po-hsiung – Experimental Class 5, Minister of the Interior Ministry, as of 2007 Vice President of Kuomintang.
 Dai Dong-yuan – Experimental Class 5, President of National Taiwan University Hospital.
 Tan Chong-wen – Experimental Class 5, one of the inventors of IBM's "Deep Blue."
 Xu Xiao-bo – Experimental Class 5, attorney.
 Miao Young-qing – Senior High Class 55, Supreme Commander of the Republic of China Navy
 Taylor Gun-Jin Wang – Senior High Class 57, scientist，first Chinese astronaut.
 Chang Po-ya – Experimental Class 10, Mayor of Chiayi City.
 Liu Zhao-xuan – Experimental Class 12，前行政院副院長，前交通部長，前 國立清華大學 校長、東吳大學 校長
 Jiang Xun – 木聯14班, painter, poet and writer.
 Guo Song-fen – (1938–2005) writer, 保釣運動代表人物之一。
 Zhou Yu – Senior High Class 100, 紫藤盧 負責人。
 Hsia Chu-joe – Senior High Class 103, professor of 台大城鄉所.
 Li Cang-han – Experimental Class 27, architect.
 Weng Shi-ren – Experimental Class 28, entrepreneur.
 Seetoo Dah-Hsian – Experimental Class 29, Professor of Business Administration, Department of National Cheng-chi University. 西北大學企業政策博士，政大企管系  教授。
 Chang An-lo – Senior High Class 132, "White Wolf", United Bamboo Gang's boss. He killed Chiang Nan in the United States and has since been in jail in America.
 Li Gan-lang – Senior High Class 151, scientist of ancient constructions.
 Li Shang-ze – Senior High Class 157，one of the founding members of the 民歌運動 (Folk Music Movement)。
 Luo Zhi-cheng – Senior High Class 282, poet. 現任台北市新聞局局長。
 Yuan Ding-weng – Senior High Class 286, baseball player. 因擁有美國匹茲堡大學地質學博士學位，投入棒球評論工作，棒球界稱之為袁博士。
 Zhang Hong-liang – Senior High Class 363, singer, dentist.
 Lin Yao-de – (1962–1996) Senior High Class 398, writer and poet.
 Tong Xiang-long – Senior High Class 417, journalist, political analyst.
 Luo Wen-jia – Senior High Class 509, a legislator from Democratic Progressive Party between 2002 and 2004, a major member of Council for Hakka Affairs between 2004 and 2005.
 Xin Ping Wong – Senior High Class 569, singer, daughter of actor 演員 王羽 之女。
 Chu Shi-ying – Senior High Class 638, writer.
 Bao Jia-xin – Senior High Class 711, 英文小魔女。
 Liu Zhen – Senior High Class 729, dancer.
 Lucifer Zhu – Senior High Class 738, translated The Lord of the Rings to Chinese.
 Zhu Zhi-xian – Senior High Class 746, writer. 曾為《音樂時代》、《新朝藝術》主筆，編著有《杜撰的城堡——附中野史》，著有《指揮大師 亨利‧梅哲》。
 Mayday – (Wu Yue Tian) Four members of the band graduated from HSNU:
 including Ashin (Chen Shin Hung, Senior High Class 778), the vocalist
Monster (Wen Shang Yi, Senior High Class 776), the leader and guitarist
Stone (Shi Chin-hang, Senior High Class 818), the guitarist
 Masa (Tsai Shen-yen, Senior High Class 819), the bassist
 Relax One – Two of the four member group are alumni of HSNU: 包括有吉他社社員—鼓手阿貴 (趙貴民，Senior High Class 844)以及吉他手小毛(毛琮文，Junior High Class 79)。
 Yen Chun-Chieh – Senior High Class 108, pianist.
 Yu You-cheng – Experimental Class 5, executive board member of One Angstrom Investment Company.  Worked at Intel Corp. for nearly 30 years， Started the Asian Culture Integration club while in Intel.
 Chen Zi-wei – Senior High Class 872, captain of Chinese Taipei's field hockey team.
 Evan Yo – Senior High Class 1046 (Music Class), pop singer signed with Sony BMG; his debut album was "19".
 Wu Tsing-fong – Singer, lead vocalist of the band Sodagreen.

See also 
 National Taiwan Normal University

External links
 School website
 HSNU Uncle Omelet memorial website

High schools in Taiwan
Educational institutions established in 1947
1947 establishments in China
Schools in Taipei
National Taiwan Normal University